Anastoechus is a genus of bee flies (insects in the family Bombyliidae). There are at least 90 described species in Anastoechus.

Species
These 90 species belong to the genus Anastoechus:

 Anastoechus aberrans Paramonov, 1940 c g
 Anastoechus aegyptiacus Paramonov, 1930 c g
 Anastoechus airis Greathead, 1970 c g
 Anastoechus andalusiacus Paramonov, 1930 c g
 Anastoechus angustifrons Paramonov, 1930 c g
 Anastoechus anomalus Paramonov, 1940 c g
 Anastoechus araxis Paramonov, 1926 c g
 Anastoechus argyrocomus Hesse, 1938 c g
 Anastoechus asiaticus Becker, 1916 c g
 Anastoechus aurecrinitus Du & Yang, 1991 c g
 Anastoechus aurifrons Efflatoun, 1945 c g
 Anastoechus bahirae Becker, 1915 c g
 Anastoechus baigakumensis Paramonov, 1926 c g
 Anastoechus bangalorensis Kapoor & Agarwal, 1978 c g
 Anastoechus barbatus Osten Sacken, 1877 i c g b
 Anastoechus bitinctus Becker, 1916 c g
 Anastoechus candidus g
 Anastoechus caucasicus Paramonov, 1930 c g
 Anastoechus chakanus Du & al., 2008 g
 Anastoechus chinensis Paramonov, 1930 c g
 Anastoechus deserticolus Hesse, 1938 c g
 Anastoechus dolosus Hesse, 1938 c g
 Anastoechus doulananus Du & al., 2008 g
 Anastoechus elegans Paramonov, 1930 c g
 Anastoechus erinaceus Bezzi, 1921 c g
 Anastoechus exalbidus (Wiedemann, 1820) c g
 Anastoechus firjuzanus Paramonov, 1930 c g
 Anastoechus flaveolus Becker, 1916 c g
 Anastoechus flavosericatus Hesse, 1938 c g
 Anastoechus fulvescens Becker & Stein, 1913 c g
 Anastoechus fulvus g
 Anastoechus fuscianulatus Hesse, 1938 c g
 Anastoechus fuscus Paramonov, 1926 c g
 Anastoechus hessei Hall, 1958 i c g b
 Anastoechus hummeli Paramonov, 1933 c g
 Anastoechus hyrcanus (Pallas & Wiedemann, 1818) c g
 Anastoechus innocuus Bezzi, 1921 c g
 Anastoechus kashmirensis Zaitzev, 1988 c g
 Anastoechus latifrons (Macquart, 1839) c g
 Anastoechus leucosoma Bezzi, 1921 c g
 Anastoechus leucothrix Hall & Evenhuis, 1981 i c g b
 Anastoechus longirostris van-der van der Wulp, 1885 c
 Anastoechus longirostris Wulp, 1885 g
 Anastoechus macrophthalmus Bezzi, 1921 c g
 Anastoechus macrorrhynchus Bezzi, 1924 c g
 Anastoechus melanohalteralis Tucker, 1907 i c g b
 Anastoechus mellinus Francois, 1969 c g
 Anastoechus meridionalis Bezzi, 1912 c g
 Anastoechus miscens (Walker, 1871) c g
 Anastoechus mongolicus Paramonov, 1930 c g
 Anastoechus monticola Paramonov, 1930 c g
 Anastoechus montium Becker, 1916 c g
 Anastoechus mylabricida Zakhvatkin, 1934 c g
 Anastoechus neimongolanus Du, 1991 c g
 Anastoechus nigricirratus Becker & Stein, 1913 c g
 Anastoechus nitens Hesse, 1938 c g
 Anastoechus nitidulus (Fabricius, 1794) c g
 Anastoechus niveicollis Enderlein, 1934 c g
 Anastoechus nividulus Evenhuis & Greathead, 1999 c g
 Anastoechus nivifrons (Walker, 1871) c g
 Anastoechus nivosus Greathead, 1996 c g
 Anastoechus nomas Paramonov, 1930 c g
 Anastoechus olivaceus Paramonov, 1930 c g
 Anastoechus phaleratus Hesse, 1938 c g
 Anastoechus pruinosus Hesse, 1938 c g
 Anastoechus pulcher Paramonov, 1930 c g
 Anastoechus ravus Greathead, 1970 c g
 Anastoechus retardatus Becker & Stein, 1913 c g
 Anastoechus rubicundus Bezzi, 1924 c g
 Anastoechus rubricosus (Wiedemann, 1821) c g
 Anastoechus rubriventris Paramonov, 1930 c g
 Anastoechus setosus (Loew, 1855) c g
 Anastoechus sibiricus Becker, 1916 c g
 Anastoechus smirnovi Paramonov, 1926 c g
 Anastoechus spinifacies Bezzi, 1924 c g
 Anastoechus stackelbergi Paramonov, 1926 c g
 Anastoechus stramineus (Wiedemann, 1820) c g
 Anastoechus subviridis Greathead, 1996 c g
 Anastoechus suzukii Matsumura, 1916 c g
 Anastoechus syrdarjensis Paramonov, 1926 c g
 Anastoechus trisignatus (Portschinsky, 1881) c g
 Anastoechus turanicus Paramonov, 1926 c g
 Anastoechus turkestanicus Paramonov, 1926 c g
 Anastoechus turkmenorum Paramonov, 1930 c g
 Anastoechus turriformis g
 Anastoechus varipecten Bezzi, 1921 c g
 Anastoechus vlasovi Paramonov, 1930 c g
 Anastoechus xaralicus Paramonov, 1940 c g
 Anastoechus xuthus g
 Anastoechus zimini Paramonov, 1940 c g

Data sources: i = ITIS, c = Catalogue of Life, g = GBIF, b = Bugguide.net

References

Further reading

External links

 

Bombyliidae genera
Articles created by Qbugbot
Taxa named by Carl Robert Osten-Sacken